Edith Wharton (born Edith Newbold Jones; January 24, 1862 – August 11, 1937) was an American writer and designer. Wharton drew upon her insider's knowledge of the upper-class New York "aristocracy" to portray realistically the lives and morals of the Gilded Age. In 1921, she became the first woman to win the Pulitzer Prize in Fiction, for her novel The Age of Innocence. She was inducted into the National Women's Hall of Fame in 1996. Among her other well known works are The House of Mirth, the novella Ethan Frome, and several notable ghost stories.

Biography

Early life

Edith Wharton was born Edith Newbold Jones on January 24, 1862, to George Frederic Jones and Lucretia Stevens Rhinelander at their brownstone at 14 West Twenty-third Street in New York City.  To her friends and family she was known as "Pussy Jones".  She had two older brothers, Frederic Rhinelander and Henry Edward.  Frederic married Mary Cadwalader Rawle; their daughter was landscape architect Beatrix Farrand. Edith was baptized April 20, 1862, Easter Sunday, at Grace Church.

Wharton's paternal family, the Joneses, were a very wealthy and socially prominent family having made their money in real estate. The saying "keeping up with the Joneses" is said to refer to her father's family. She was related to the Rensselaers, the most prestigious of the old patroon families, who had received land grants from the former Dutch government of New York and New Jersey. Her father's first cousin was Caroline Schermerhorn Astor. Fort Stevens in New York was named for Wharton's maternal great-grandfather, Ebenezer Stevens, a Revolutionary War hero and General. 

Wharton was born during the Civil War; however, in describing her family life Wharton does not mention the war except that their travels to Europe after the war were due to the depreciation of American currency. From 1866 to 1872, the Jones family visited France, Italy, Germany, and Spain. During her travels, the young Edith became fluent in French, German, and Italian. At the age of nine, she suffered from typhoid fever, which nearly killed her, while the family was at a spa in the Black Forest. After the family returned to the United States in 1872, they spent their winters in New York City and their summers in Newport, Rhode Island. While in Europe, she was educated by tutors and governesses. She rejected the standards of fashion and etiquette that were expected of young girls at the time, which were intended to allow women to marry well and to be put on display at balls and parties. She considered these fashions superficial and oppressive. Edith wanted more education than she received, so she read from her father's library and from the libraries of her father's friends. Her mother forbade her to read novels until she was married, and Edith obeyed this command.

Early writing

Wharton wrote and told stories from an early age. When her family moved to Europe and she was just four or five she started what she called "making up." She invented stories for her family and walked with an open book, turning the pages as if reading while improvising a story. Wharton began writing poetry and fiction as a young girl, and attempted to write her first novel at the age of 11. Her mother's criticism quashed her ambition and she turned to poetry. She was 15 years old when her first published work appeared, a translation of a German poem "Was die Steine Erzählen" ("What the Stones Tell") by Heinrich Karl Brugsch, for which she was paid $50. Her family did not want her name to appear in print since writing was not considered a proper occupation for a society woman of her time. Consequently, the poem was published under the name of a friend's father, E. A. Washburn, a cousin of Ralph Waldo Emerson who supported women's education. In 1877, at the age of 15, she secretly wrote a novella, Fast and Loose. In 1878, her father arranged for a collection of two dozen original poems and five translations, Verses, to be privately published. Wharton published a poem under a pseudonym in the New York World in 1879. In 1880, she had five poems published anonymously in the Atlantic Monthly, an important literary magazine. Despite these early successes, she was not encouraged by her family or her social circle, and though she continued to write, she did not publish anything more until her poem "The Last Giustiniani" was published in Scribner's Magazine in October 1889.

The "debutante" years 
Between 1880 and 1890, Wharton put her writing aside to participate in the social rituals of the New York upper classes. She keenly observed the social changes happening around her, which she used later in her writing. Wharton officially came out as a debutante to society in 1879. She was allowed to bare her shoulders and wear her hair up for the first time at a December dance given by a Society matron, Anna Morton. Wharton began a courtship with Henry Leyden Stevens, the son of Paran Stevens, a wealthy hotelier and real estate investor from rural New Hampshire. His sister Minnie married Arthur Paget. The Jones family did not approve of Stevens.

In the middle of her debutante season, the Jones family returned to Europe in 1881 for her father's health. In spite of this, her father, George Frederic Jones, died of a stroke in Cannes in 1882. Stevens was with the Jones family in Europe during this time. After returning to the United States with her mother, Wharton continued her courtship with Stevens, announcing their engagement in August 1882. The month the two were to marry, the engagement abruptly ended.

Wharton's mother, Lucretia Stevens Rhinelander Jones, moved back to Paris in 1883 and lived there until her death in 1901.

1880s–1900s

On April 29, 1885, at the age of 23, Wharton married Edward Robbins (Teddy) Wharton, who was 12 years her senior, at the Trinity Chapel Complex in Manhattan. From a well-established Boston family, he was a sportsman and a gentleman of the same social class and shared her love of travel. The Whartons set up house at Pencraig Cottage in Newport. In 1893, they bought a house named Land's End, on the other side of Newport, for $80,000, and moved into it. Wharton decorated Land's End with the help of designer Ogden Codman. In 1897, the Whartons purchased their New York home, 884 Park Avenue. Between 1886 and 1897, they traveled overseas in the period from February to June – mostly visiting Italy but also Paris and England. From her marriage onwards, three interests came to dominate Wharton's life: American houses, writing, and Italy.

From the late 1880s until 1902, Teddy Wharton suffered from chronic depression, and the couple then ceased their extensive travel. At that time, his depression became more debilitating, after which they lived almost exclusively at their estate The Mount in Lenox, Massachusetts. During those same years, Wharton herself was said to suffer from asthma and periods of depression.

In 1908, Teddy Wharton's mental condition was determined to be incurable. In that year, Wharton began an affair with Morton Fullerton, an author and foreign correspondent for The Times of London, in whom she found an intellectual partner. She divorced Edward Wharton in 1913, after 28 years of marriage. Around the same time, she was beset with harsh literary criticism from the naturalist school of writers.

In addition to novels, Wharton wrote at least 85 short stories. She was also a garden designer, an interior designer, and a taste-maker of her time. She wrote several design books, including her first major published work, The Decoration of Houses (1897), co-authored by Ogden Codman. Another of her "home and garden" books is the generously illustrated Italian Villas and Their Gardens of 1904, illustrated by Maxfield Parrish.

Travels and life abroad

She eventually crossed the Atlantic 60 times. In Europe, her primary destinations were Italy, France, and England. She also went to Morocco. She wrote many books about her travels, including Italian Backgrounds and A Motor-Flight through France.

Her husband Edward Wharton shared her love of travel and for many years they spent at least four months of each year abroad, mainly in Italy. Their friend Egerton Winthrop accompanied them on many journeys there. In 1888, the Whartons and their friend James Van Alen took a cruise through the Aegean islands. Wharton was 26. The trip cost the Whartons $10,000 and lasted four months. She kept a travel journal during this trip that was thought to be lost but was later published as The Cruise of the Vanadis, now considered her earliest known travel writing.

In 1897, Edith Wharton purchased Land's End in Newport, Rhode Island, from Robert Livingston Beeckman, a former U.S. Open Tennis Championship runner-up who became governor of Rhode Island. At the time, Wharton described the main house as "incurably ugly." Wharton agreed to pay $80,000 for the property, and spent thousands more to alter the home's facade, decorate the interior, and landscape the grounds.

In 1902, Wharton designed The Mount, her estate in Lenox, Massachusetts, which survives today as an example of her design principles. She wrote several of her novels there, including The House of Mirth (1905), the first of many chronicles of life in old New York. At The Mount, she entertained the cream of American literary society, including her close friend, novelist Henry James, who described the estate as "a delicate French chateau mirrored in a Massachusetts pond". Although she spent many months traveling in Europe nearly every year with her friend, Egerton Winthrop (a descendant of John Winthrop), The Mount was her primary residence until 1911. When living there and while traveling abroad, Wharton was usually driven to appointments by her longtime chauffeur and friend Charles Cook, a native of nearby South Lee, Massachusetts. When her marriage deteriorated, she decided to move permanently to France, living first at 53 Rue de Varenne, Paris, in an apartment that belonged to George Washington Vanderbilt II.

Wharton was preparing to vacation for the summer when World War I broke out. Though many fled Paris, she moved back to her Paris apartment on the Rue de Varenne and for four years was a tireless and ardent supporter of the French war effort. One of the first causes she undertook in August 1914 was the opening of a workroom for unemployed women; here they were fed and paid one franc a day. What began with 30 women soon doubled to 60, and their sewing business began to thrive. When the Germans invaded Belgium in the fall of 1914 and Paris was flooded with Belgian refugees, she helped to set up the American Hostels for Refugees, which managed to get them shelter, meals, and clothes, and eventually created an employment agency to help them find work. She collected more than $100,000 on their behalf. In early 1915, she organized the Children of Flanders Rescue Committee, which gave shelter to nearly 900 Belgian refugees who had fled when their homes were bombed by the Germans.

Aided by her influential connections in the French government, she and her long-time friend Walter Berry (then president of the American Chamber of Commerce in Paris), were among the few foreigners in France allowed to travel to the front lines during World War I. She and Berry made five journeys between February and August 1915, which Wharton described in a series of articles that were first published in Scribner's Magazine and later as Fighting France: From Dunkerque to Belfort, which became an American bestseller. Travelling by car, Wharton and Berry drove through the war zone, viewing one decimated French village after another. She visited the trenches, and was within earshot of artillery fire. She wrote, "We woke to a noise of guns closer and more incessant ... and when we went out into the streets it seemed as if, overnight, a new army had sprung out of the ground".

Throughout the war, she worked tirelessly in charitable efforts for refugees, the injured, the unemployed, and the displaced. She was a "heroic worker on behalf of her adopted country". On April 18, 1916, Raymond Poincaré, the then-President of France appointed her Chevalier of the Legion of Honour, the country's highest award, in recognition of her dedication to the war effort. Her relief work included setting up workrooms for unemployed French women, organizing concerts to provide work for musicians, raising tens of thousands of dollars for the war effort, and opening tuberculosis hospitals. In 1915, Wharton edited a charity benefit volume, The Book of the Homeless, which included essays, art, poetry, and musical scores by many major contemporary European and American artists, including Henry James, Joseph Conrad, William Dean Howells, Anna de Noailles, Jean Cocteau, and Walter Gay, among others. Wharton proposed the book to her publisher, Scribner's, handled the business arrangements, lined up contributors, and translated the French entries into English. Theodore Roosevelt wrote a two-page introduction in which he praised Wharton's effort and urged Americans to support the war. She also kept up her own work, continuing to write novels, short stories, and poems, as well as reporting for The New York Times and keeping up her enormous correspondence. Wharton urged Americans to support the war effort and encouraged America to enter the war. She wrote the popular romantic novel Summer in 1916, the war novella The Marne in 1918, and A Son at the Front in 1919 (published 1923). When the war ended, she watched the Victory Parade from the Champs Elysees' balcony of a friend's apartment. After four years of intense effort, she decided to leave Paris for the quiet of the countryside. She lived there in summer and autumn for the rest of her life, spending winters and springs on the French Riviera at Sainte Claire du Vieux Chateau in Hyères.

Wharton was a committed supporter of French imperialism, describing herself as a "rabid imperialist", and the war solidified her political views. After the war, she traveled to Morocco as the guest of Resident General Hubert Lyautey and wrote the book In Morocco, full of praise for the French administration, Lyautey, and particularly his wife.

During the post-war years, she divided her time between Hyères and Provence, where she finished The Age of Innocence in 1920. She returned to the United States only once after the war to receive an honorary doctorate from Yale University in 1923.

Later years
The Age of Innocence (1920) won the 1921 Pulitzer Prize for Fiction, making Wharton the first woman to win the award. The three fiction judges – literary critic Stuart Pratt Sherman, literature professor Robert Morss Lovett, and novelist Hamlin Garland – voted to give the prize to Sinclair Lewis for his satire Main Street, but Columbia University's advisory board, led by conservative university president Nicholas Murray Butler, overturned their decision and awarded the prize to The Age of Innocence. She was also nominated for the Nobel Prize in Literature in 1927, 1928, and 1930.

Wharton was friend and confidante to many prominent intellectuals of her time: Henry James, Sinclair Lewis, Jean Cocteau, and André Gide were all her guests at one time or another. Theodore Roosevelt, Bernard Berenson, and Kenneth Clark were valued friends as well. Particularly notable was her meeting with F. Scott Fitzgerald, described by the editors of her letters as "one of the better known failed encounters in the American literary annals". She spoke fluent French, Italian, and German, and many of her books were published in both French and English.

In 1934, Wharton's autobiography A Backward Glance was published. In the view of Judith E. Funston, writing on Edith Wharton in American National Biography, What is most notable about A Backward Glance, however, is what it does not tell: her criticism of Lucretia Jones [her mother], her difficulties with Teddy, and her affair with Morton Fullerton, which did not come to light until her papers, deposited in Yale's Beinecke Rare Book Room and Manuscript Library, were opened in 1968.

Death

On June 1, 1937, Wharton was at her French country home (shared with Ogden Codman), where she was at work on a revised edition of The Decoration of Houses, when she suffered a heart attack and collapsed.
 
She died of a stroke on August 11, 1937, at Le Pavillon Colombe, her 18th-century house on Rue de Montmorency in Saint-Brice-sous-Forêt. She died at 5:30 p.m., but her death was not known in Paris. At her bedside was her friend, Mrs. Royall Tyler. Wharton was buried in the American Protestant section of the Cimetière des Gonards in Versailles, "with all the honors owed a war hero and a chevalier of the Legion of Honor...a group of some one hundred friends sang a verse of the hymn 'O Paradise'..."

Writing

Career
Despite not publishing her first novel until she was forty, Wharton became an extraordinarily productive writer. In addition to
her 15 novels, seven novellas, and eighty-five short stories, she published poetry, books on design, travel, literary and cultural criticism, and a memoir.

In 1873, Wharton wrote a short story and gave it to her mother to read. Stinging from her mother's critique, Wharton decided to write only poetry. While she constantly sought her mother's approval and love, she rarely received either, and their relationship was a troubled one. Before she was 15, Wharton wrote Fast and Loose (1877). In her youth, she wrote about society. Her central themes came from her experiences with her parents. She was very critical of her work and wrote public reviews criticizing it. She also wrote about her own experiences with life. "Intense Love's Utterance" is a poem written about Henry Stevens.

In 1889, she sent out three poems for publication, to Scribner's, Harper's and Century. Edward L. Burlingame published "The Last Giustiniani" for Scribner's. It was not until Wharton was 29 that her first short story was published: "Mrs. Manstey's View" had very little success, and it took her more than a year to publish another story. She completed "The Fullness of Life" following her annual European trip with Teddy. Burlingame was critical of this story but Wharton did not want to make edits to it. This story, along with many others, speaks about her marriage. She sent Bunner Sisters to Scribner's in 1892. Burlingame wrote back that it was too long for Scribner's to publish. This story is believed to be based on an experience she had as a child. It did not see publication until 1916 and is included in the collection called Xingu.
After a visit with her friend, Paul Bourget, she wrote "The Good May Come" and "The Lamp of Psyche". "The Lamp of Psyche" was a comical story with verbal wit and sorrow. After "Something Exquisite" was rejected by Burlingame, she lost confidence in herself. She started travel writing in 1894.

In 1901, Wharton wrote a two-act play called Man of Genius. This play was about an English man who was having an affair with his secretary. The play was rehearsed but was never produced. Another 1901 play, The Shadow of a Doubt, which also came close to being staged but fell through, was thought to be lost, until it was discovered in 2017. Its world premiere was a radio adaptation broadcast on BBC Radio 3 in 2018.  She collaborated with Marie Tempest to write another play, but the two only completed four acts before Marie decided she was no longer interested in costume plays. One of her earliest literary endeavors (1902) was the translation of the play Es Lebe das Leben ("The Joy of Living"), by Hermann Sudermann. The Joy of Living was criticized for its title because the heroine swallows poison at the end, and was a short-lived Broadway production. It was, however, a successful book.

Many of Wharton's novels are characterized by subtle use of dramatic irony. Having grown up in upper-class, late-19th-century society, Wharton became one of its most astute critics, in such works as The House of Mirth and The Age of Innocence.

Themes
Versions of her mother, Lucretia Jones, often appeared in Wharton's fiction. Biographer Hermione Lee described it as "one of the most lethal acts of revenge ever taken by a writing daughter." In her memoir, A Backward Glance, Wharton describes her mother as indolent, spendthrift, censorious, disapproving, superficial, icy, dry and ironic.

Wharton's writings often dealt with themes such as "social and individual fulfillment, repressed sexuality, and the manners of old families and the new elite." Maureen Howard, editor of Edith Wharton: Collected Stories, notes several recurring themes in Wharton's short stories, including confinement and attempts at freedom, the morality of the author, critiques of intellectual pretension, and the "unmasking" of the truth. Wharton's writing also explored themes of "social mores and social reform" as they relate to the "extremes and anxieties of the Gilded Age". These themes were expressed in her ghost stories, in which supernatural specters function as richly costumed variations on a theme of all-too-human cruelty.

A key recurring theme in Wharton's writing is the relationship between the house as a physical space and its relationship to its inhabitant's characteristics and emotions. Maureen Howard argues "Edith Wharton conceived of houses, dwelling places, in extended imagery of shelter and dispossession. Houses – their confinement and their theatrical possibilities…they are never mere settings."

Influences
American children's stories containing slang were forbidden in Wharton's childhood home. This included such popular authors as Mark Twain, Bret Harte, and Joel Chandler Harris. She was allowed to read Louisa May Alcott but Wharton preferred Lewis Carroll's Alice's Adventures in Wonderland and Charles Kingsley's The Water-Babies, A Fairy Tale for a Land Baby. Wharton's mother forbade her from reading many novels and Wharton said she "read everything else but novels until the day of my marriage."  Instead Wharton read the classics, philosophy, history, and poetry in her father's library including Daniel Defoe, John Milton, Thomas Carlyle, Alphonse de Lamartine, Victor Hugo, Jean Racine, Thomas Moore, Lord Byron, William Wordsworth, John Ruskin, and Washington Irving. Biographer Hermione Lee describes Wharton as having read herself "out of Old New York" and her influences included Herbert Spencer, Charles Darwin, Friedrich Nietzsche, T. H. Huxley, George Romanes, James Frazer, and Thorstein Veblen. These influenced her ethnographic style of novelization. Wharton developed a passion for Walt Whitman.

Works
Source:

Novels
 The Valley of Decision, 1902
 The House of Mirth, 1905
 The Fruit of the Tree, 1907
 The Reef, 1912
 The Custom of the Country, 1913
 Summer, 1917
 The Marne, 1918
 The Age of Innocence, 1920 (Pulitzer Prize winner)
 The Spinster, 1921
 The Glimpses of the Moon, 1922
 A Son at the Front, 1923
 The Old Maid, 1924
 The Mother's Recompense, 1925
 Twilight Sleep, 1927
 The Children, 1928
 Hudson River Bracketed, 1929
 The Gods Arrive, 1932
 The Buccaneers, 1938 (unfinished)

Novellas and novelette
 The Touchstone, 1900
 Sanctuary, 1903
 Madame de Treymes, 1907
 Ethan Frome, 1911
 Bunner Sisters, 1916
 Old New York, 19241. False Dawn; 2. The Old Maid; 3. The Spark; 4. New Year's Day
 Fast and Loose: A Novelette, 1938 (written in 1876–1877)

Poetry
 Verses, 1878
 Artemis to Actaeon and Other Verse, 1909
 Twelve Poems, 1926

Short story collections
 The Greater Inclination, 1899, includes Souls Belated.
 Crucial Instances, 1901
 The Descent of Man and Other Stories, 1904
 The Hermit and the Wild Woman and Other Stories, 1908
 Tales of Men and Ghosts, 1910

 Xingu and Other Stories, 1916
"Xingu"; "Coming Home"; "Autres Temps ..."; "Kerfol"; "The Long Run"; "The Triumph of Night"; "The Choice"; "The Bunner Sisters"
 Here and Beyond, 1926
 Certain People, 1930
 Human Nature, 1933
 The World Over, 1936
 Ghosts, 1937
 Roman Fever and Other Stories, 1964
 Madame de Treymes and Others: Four Novelettes, 1970
 The Ghost Stories of Edith Wharton, 1973
"The Lady's Maid's Bell"; "The Eyes"; "Afterward"; "Kerfol"; "The Triumph of Night"; "Miss Mary Pask"; "Bewitched"; "Mr Jones"; "Pomegranate Seed"; "The Looking Glass"; "All Souls"
 The Collected Stories of Edith Wharton, 1998 (Carroll & Graf Publishers; paperback, 640 pages)
"The Pelican"; "The Other Two"; "The Mission of Jane"; "The Reckoning"; "The Last Asset"; "The Letters"; "Autres Temps ..."; "The Long Run"; "After Holbein"; "Atrophy"; "Pomegranate Seed"; "Her Son"; "Charm Incorporated"; "All Souls"; "The Lamp of Psyche"; "A Journey"; "The Line of Least Resistance"; "The Moving Finger"; "Expiation"; "Les Metteurs en Scene"; "Full Circle"; "The Daunt Diana"; "Afterward"; "The Bolted Door"; "The Temperate Zone"; "Diagnosis"; "The Day of the Funeral"; "Confession"
 The New York Stories of Edith Wharton, 2007 paperback 452 pages, NYREV publishers
 1. Mrs. Manstey's view; 2. That good may come; 3. The portrait; 4. A cup of cold water; 5. A journey; 6. The Rembrandt; 7. The other two; 8. The quicksand; 9. The dilettante; 10. The reckoning; 11. Expiation; 12. The pot-boiler; 13. His father's son; 14. Full circle; 15. Autres temps; 16. The long run; 17. After Holbein; 18. Diagnosis; 19. Pomegranate seed; 20. Roman fever

Non-fiction
 The Decoration of Houses, 1897
 Italian Villas and Their Gardens, 1904
 Italian Backgrounds, 1905
 A Motor-Flight Through France, 1908
 The Cruise of the Vanadis, 1910
 Fighting France: From Dunkerque to Belfort, 1915
 French Ways and Their Meaning, 1919
 In Morocco, 1920 (travel)
 The Writing of Fiction, 1925
 A Backward Glance, 1934 (autobiography)
 Edith Wharton: The Uncollected Critical Writings, Edited by Frederick Wegener, 1996
 Edith Wharton Abroad: Selected Travel Writings, 1888–1920, 1995, Edited by Sarah Bird Wright

As editor
 The Book of the Homeless, 1916

Adaptations
Source:

Film
The House of Mirth, a 1918 silent film adaptation (6 reels) (of the 1905 novel) directed by French film director Albert Capellani, starring Katherine Harris Barrymore as Lily Bart. It is considered to be a lost film.
The Glimpses Of The Moon, a 1923 silent film adaptation (7 reels) (of the 1922 novel) directed for Paramount Studios by Allan Dwan, starring Bebe Daniels, David Powell, Nita Naldi and Maurice Costello. It is considered to be a lost film.
The Age of Innocence, a 1924 silent film adaptation (7 reels) (of the 1920 novel) directed for Warner Brothers by Wesley Ruggles, starring Beverly Bayne and Elliott Dexter. It is considered to be a lost film.
The Marriage Playground, a 1929 talking film adaptation (70 minutes) (of the 1928 novel The Children) directed for Paramount Studios by Lothar Mendes, starring rising star Fredric March in leading role (as Martin Boyne), Mary Brian (as Judith Wheater), and Kay Francis (as Lady Wrench).
The Age of Innocence, a 1934 film adaptation (9 reels / circa 80–90 minutes) (of the 1920 novel) directed for RKO Studios by Philip Moeller, starring Irene Dunne and John Boles.
Strange Wives, a 1934 film adaptation (8 reels / 75 minutes) (of the 1934 short story Bread Upon the Waters) directed for Universal by Richard Thorpe, starring Roger Pryor (as Jimmy King), June Clayworth (as Nadja), and Esther Ralston (as Olga). It is considered to be a lost film.
The Old Maid, a 1939 film adaptation (95 minutes) (of the 1924 short novella) directed by Edmund Goulding starring Bette Davis.
 A 1944 film version of the 1911 novel Ethan Frome starring Joan Crawford was proposed, but never came to fruition.
The Children (115 minutes) directed by Tony Palmer and released in 1990, starring Ben Kingsley and Kim Novak.
Ethan Frome (99 minutes) directed by John Madden and released in 1993, starring Liam Neeson and Patricia Arquette.
The Age of Innocence (138 minutes) directed by Martin Scorsese and released in 1993, starring Daniel Day-Lewis, Winona Ryder and Michelle Pfeiffer.
 The Reef (88 minutes) directed by Robert Allan Ackerman and released in 1999.
The House of Mirth (140 minutes) directed by Terence Davies and released in 2000, starring Gillian Anderson as Lily Bart.

Television
The Touchstone, a live broadcast on CBS April 1951. First Wharton adaptation on television.
Ethan Frome, a 1960 (CBS) TV US adaptation, directed by Alex Segal, starring Sterling Hayden as Ethan Frome, Julie Harris as Mattie Silver and Clarice Blackburn as Zenobia Frome. 
Looking Back, a 1981 TV US loose adaptation of two biographies of Edith Wharton: A Backward Glance, Wharton's own 1934 autobiography & Edith Wharton, a 1975 biography by R.W.B. Lewis (1976 Bancroft Prize-winner).
The House of Mirth, a 1981 TV US adaptation, directed by Adrian Hall, starring William Atherton, Geraldine Chaplin and Barbara Blossom
The Buccaneers, a 1995 BBC mini-series, starring Carla Gugino and Greg Wise

Theater
The House of Mirth was adapted as a play in 1906 by Edith Wharton and Clyde Fitch
The Age of Innocence was adapted as a play in 1928. Katharine Cornell played the role of Ellen Olenska.

Ballet
Ethan Frome was adapted by Cathy Marston as a one-act ballet titled Snowblind for the San Francisco Ballet. The ballet premiered in 2018, with Ulrik Birkkjaer as Ethan, Sarah Van Patten as Zeena and Mathilde Froustey as Mattie.

In popular culture
 Edith Wharton was honored on a U.S. postage stamp issued on September 5, 1980.
 In The Young Indiana Jones Chronicles, Edith Wharton (Clare Higgins) travels across North Africa with Indiana Jones in Chapter 16, Tales of Innocence.
 Edith Wharton is mentioned in the HBO television series Entourage in the 2007 third season's 13th episode: Vince is handed a screenplay for Wharton's The Glimpses of the Moon by Amanda, his new agent, for a film to be directed by Sam Mendes. In the same episode, period films of Wharton's work are lampooned by agent Ari Gold, who says that all her stories are "about a guy who likes a girl, but he can't have sex with her for five years, because those were the times!" Carla Gugino, who plays Amanda, was the protagonist of the BBC-PBS adaptation of The Buccaneers (1995), one of her early jobs.
Gilmore Girls makes various witty references to Wharton throughout the series. In season 1, episode 6 called "Rory's Birthday Parties", Lorelei jokingly says, "Edith Wharton would be proud." Referring to Emily's extravagant birthday party for Rory. In Gilmore Girls: A Year in the Life the tradition continues as Lorelei quips Emily with a Wharton mention in the first episode.
 In a 2009 episode of Gossip Girl called "The Age of Dissonance", characters put on a production of a play version of The Age of Innocence and find their personal lives mirroring the play. 
 "Edith Wharton's Journey" is a radio adaptation, for the NPR series Radio Tales, of the short story "A Journey" from Edith Wharton's collection The Greater Inclination.
 The American singer and songwriter Suzanne Vega paid homage to Edith Wharton in her song "Edith Wharton's Figurines" on her 2007 studio album Beauty & Crime.
In Dawson's Creek, Pacey reads and takes a verbal quiz on Ethan Frome.
The Magnetic Fields have a song which summarises the plot of Ethan Frome.

References

Citations

Sources

Further reading 
 Armbruster, Elif S. (2011) "Domestic Biographies: Stowe, Howells, James, and Wharton at Home." New York: Peter Lang
 Benstock, Shari (1994) No Gifts From Chance: a biography of Edith Wharton. New York: Charles Scribner's Sons.
Collas, Philippe and Eric Villedary, Edith Wharton's French Riviera (2002) Paris, New York : Flammarion/Rizzoli
Drizou, Myrto, ed. Critical Insights: Edith Wharton (2018) Salem Press.
 Dwight, Eleanor. (1994) Edith Wharton: An Extraordinary Life, An Illustrated Biography New York: Harry N. Abrams.

 Hutchinson, Hazel (2015). The War That Used Up Words: American Writers and the First World War. New Haven, CT: Yale University Press.
 Lee, Hermione (2007) Edith Wharton. London: Chatto & Windus; New York: Knopf.
 Lewis, R. W. B. (1975) Edith Wharton: a biography New York: Harper & Row 
 
 Montgomery, Maureen E. (1998) Displaying Women: Spectacles of Leisure in Edith Wharton's New York New York: Routledge. 
Novellas and Other Writings (Cynthia Griffin Wolff, ed.) (The Library of America, 1990) , which contains her autobiography, A Backward Glance.
The Letters of Edith Wharton (R. W. B. Lewis and Nancy Lewis, eds.) , particularly the editorial introductions to the chronological sections, especially for 1902–07, 1911–14, 1919–27, and 1928–37, and the editorial footnotes to the letter to F. Scott Fitzgerald (June 8, 1925)
Twilight Sleep (R. F. Godfrey, ed.) 
 Vita-Finzi, Penelope. (1990) "Edith Wharton and the Art of Fiction." London: Continuum International Publishing
 Wolff, Cynthia Griffin (1977) A Feast of Words: The Triumph of Edith Wharton Oxford.

External links

Edith Wharton Society
The Mount: Estate and gardens designed by Edith Wharton
"Writings of Edith Wharton" from C-SPAN's American Writers: A Journey Through History
 
 Anna Catherine Bahlmann Papers Relating to Edith Wharton. Yale Collection of American Literature, Beinecke Rare Book and Manuscript Library.

Archival materials 

Edith Wharton Collection. Yale Collection of American Literature, Beinecke Rare Book and Manuscript Library.
 The Edith Wharton Papers at the Lilly Library, Indiana University
 Finding aid to Iola S. Haverstick collection of Edith Wharton materials at Columbia University. Rare Book & Manuscript Library.

Online editions
 
 
 
 
 

1862 births
1937 deaths
19th-century American novelists
20th-century American novelists
19th-century American poets
19th-century American short story writers
20th-century American short story writers
19th-century American translators
19th-century American women writers
20th-century American women writers
American expatriates in France
American women novelists
Pulitzer Prize for the Novel winners
American women short story writers
Gilded Age
Ghost story writers
Writers from New York City
Chevaliers of the Légion d'honneur
American landscape and garden designers
People from Lenox, Massachusetts
Novelists from New York (state)
American women poets
German–English translators
American women in World War I
American autobiographers
Women autobiographers
Burials at the Cimetière des Gonards
Members of the American Academy of Arts and Letters